Matej Mamić (born 13 January 1975) is a retired Croatian professional basketball player. 

He last worked as a sports director in Cedevita. As a player, Mamić played as small forward and played for clubs in his native country Croatia, as well as in Germany and Turkey.

References
 Matej Mamić in ABA League

1975 births
Living people
Alba Berlin players
Croats of Bosnia and Herzegovina
Croatian expatriate basketball people in Turkey
Croatian men's basketball players
Galatasaray S.K. (men's basketball) players
KK Cibona players
KK Split players
People from Tomislavgrad
Small forwards
KK Kvarner players